Steve Kolbeck is an American politician serving as a member of the South Dakota Senate for the 2nd district. Elected in November 2022, he assumed office on January 10, 2023.

Education 
Kolbeck earned an associate of applied science degree in telecommunications from Mitchell Technical College and a Bachelor of Science degree from South Dakota State University.

Career 
Kolbeck was elected to the South Dakota Public Utilities Commission in November 2006 and served until 2011. He was also a member of the Brandon City Council. Outside of politics, he is a principal manager at Xcel Energy. Kolbeck was elected to the South Dakota Senate in November 2022 and assumed office on January 10, 2023.

References 

Living people
South Dakota state senators
South Dakota Republicans
South Dakota State University alumni
People from Brandon, South Dakota
People from Minnehaha County, South Dakota
Year of birth missing (living people)